The 19th Producers Guild of America Awards (also known as 2008 Producers Guild Awards), honoring the best film and television producers of 2007, were held at The Beverly Hilton in Beverly Hills, California on February 2, 2008. The nominations were announced on November 14, 2007, and January 14, 2008.

Winners and nominees

Film
{| class=wikitable style="width="100%"
|-
! colspan="2" style="background:#abcdef;"| Darryl F. Zanuck Award for Outstanding Producer of Theatrical Motion Pictures
|-
| colspan="2" style="vertical-align:top;"|
 No Country for Old Men – Scott Rudin, Joel Coen, and Ethan Coen The Diving Bell and the Butterfly (Le scaphandre et le papillon) – Kathleen Kennedy and Jon Kilik
 Juno – Lianne Halfon, Mason Novick, and Russell Smith
 Michael Clayton – Jennifer Fox, Kerry Orent, and Sydney Pollack
 There Will Be Blood – Paul Thomas Anderson, Daniel Lupi, and JoAnne Sellar
|-
! colspan="2" style="background:#abcdef;"| Outstanding Producer of Animated Theatrical Motion Pictures
|-
| colspan="2" style="vertical-align:top;"|
 Ratatouille – Brad Lewis Bee Movie – Jerry Seinfeld and Christina Steinberg
 The Simpsons Movie – James L. Brooks, Matt Groening, Al Jean, Mike Scully, and Richard Sakai
|-
! colspan="2" style="background:#abcdef;"| Outstanding Producer of Documentary Theatrical Motion Pictures
|-
| colspan="2" style="vertical-align:top;"|
 Sicko – Michael Moore and Meghan O'Hara Body of War – Phil Donahue and Ellen Spiro
 Hear and Now – Irene Taylor Brodsky
 Pete Seeger: The Power of Song – Jim Brown, Michael Cohl, and William Eigen
 White Light/Black Rain: The Destruction of Hiroshima and Nagasaki – Steven Okazaki
|}

Television
{| class=wikitable style="width="100%"
|-
! colspan="2" style="background:#abcdef;"| Norman Felton Award for Outstanding Producer of Episodic Television, Drama
|-
| colspan="2" style="vertical-align:top;"|
 The Sopranos
 Dexter
 Grey's Anatomy
 Heroes
 House
 Lost
|-
! colspan="2" style="background:#abcdef;"| Danny Thomas Award for Outstanding Producer of Episodic Television, Comedy
|-
| colspan="2" style="vertical-align:top;"|
 30 Rock
 Entourage Extras The Office Ugly Betty|-
! colspan="2" style="background:#abcdef;"| David L. Wolper Award for Outstanding Producer of Long-Form Television
|-
| colspan="2" style="vertical-align:top;"|
 Bury My Heart at Wounded Knee The Bronx Is Burning High School Musical 2 Jane Eyre The Starter Wife|-
! colspan="2" style="background:#abcdef;"| Outstanding Producer of Non-Fiction Television
|-
| colspan="2" style="vertical-align:top;"|
 Planet Earth 60 Minutes Deadliest Catch Extreme Makeover: Home Edition Kathy Griffin: My Life on the D-List|-
! colspan="2" style="background:#abcdef;"| Outstanding Producer of Live Entertainment & Competition Television
|-
| colspan="2" style="vertical-align:top;"|
 The Colbert Report The Amazing Race American Idol Project Runway Real Time with Bill Maher|}

David O. Selznick Achievement Award in Theatrical Motion Pictures
Kathleen Kennedy and Frank Marshall

Milestone Award
Alan F. Horn

Norman Lear Achievement Award in Television
Dick Wolf

Stanley Kramer Award
Awarded to the motion picture that best illuminates social issues.The Great Debaters''

Vanguard Award
Awarded in recognition of outstanding achievement in new media and technology.
Chad Hurley and Steve Chen

Visionary Award
Honored to a producer exemplifying unique or uplifting quality.
Simon Fuller

References

 2007
2007 film awards
2007 guild awards
2007 television awards